Reed Creek may refer to:
Reed Creek, Georgia, a community
Reed Creek (Susquehanna River), a tributary of the Susquehanna River in New York
Reed Creek (Deep River tributary), a stream in Randolph County, North Carolina
Reed Creek (Virginia), a creek